The 1904–05 Wyoming Cowboys basketball team represented the University of Wyoming during the 1904–05 college basketball season. Coached by W. Yates in their first ever season, the Cowboys went 1–0, winning their lone game on April 21 against Laramie Town Team by a score of 17–5.

References

Wyoming
Wyoming Cowboys basketball seasons
Wyoming Cowboys basketball team
Wyoming Cowboys basketball team